Jamila (Jamila) is the first major novel by Chingiz Aytmatov, published originally in Russian in 1958. The novel is told from the point of view of a fictional Kyrgyz artist, Seit, who tells the story by looking back on his childhood. The story recounts the love between his new sister-in-law Jamilya and a local crippled young man, Daniyar, while Jamilya's husband, Sadyk, is "away at the front" (as a Soviet soldier during World War II).

Based on clues in the story, it takes place in northwestern Kyrgyzstan, presumably Talas Province. The story is backdropped against the collective farming culture which was early in its peak in that period.

Louis Aragon lauded the novelette as the "world's most beautiful love story".

Versions of the story available online 
 Jamila — A translation of Jamilia into English by Fainna Glagoleva
 Джамиля — Download of the 1968 movie production of the story

English translation of the story available in print 

 Jamilia, translated James Riordan, Telegram Books, London, 2007

References

1958 in the Soviet Union
Soviet novels
Kyrgyzstani novels
Books by Chinghiz Aitmatov
1958 novels
Novels set during World War II
Novels set in Kyrgyzstan